Yves Durand may refer to:

Yves Durand (politician) (born 1946), French politician
Yves Durand (academic) (1932–2004), French academic